Under the Covers, Vol. II is the fifth studio album by American comedy duo Ninja Sex Party. It is their second cover album and a follow-up to their previous album Under the Covers. It follows the same musical orientation, consisting of covers of songs from the 1970s and 1980s and straying from the duo's usual comedic style. 
The album was released on October 27, 2017, to positive reviews.

It is their second album to feature Tupper Ware Remix Party as backup band; guitarist Satchel from Steel Panther is also featured as a guest on "Limelight", as well as the Super Guitar Bros on the final track, "Rocket Man". Four official music videos based on tracks from the album have been released, including "Pour Some Sugar on Me" released on October 12, "Rocket Man" released on October 19, "Heat of the Moment" released on October 26, and "Africa" released on November 1 the next year. On May 2, 2019, a music video for "In Your Eyes" was released, featuring animation by artist Imogen Scoppie.  A third cover album, Under the Covers, Vol. III, was announced on October 4, 2019, on Ninja Sex Party's official Twitter page. With the official cover artwork being revealed on October 13, 2019. The album released on November 15, 2019.

Production 
On June 28, 2017, the band announced on their Facebook page that they had completed all the songs for the album, with a planned September/early October 2017 release date. The following day, they announced the tracklist.

Tupper Ware Remix Party, which have served as Ninja Sex Party's backup band since 2015, confirmed their involvement on July 2, stating that they helped "record and produce" ten of the twelve featured songs.

Track listing

Personnel
Ninja Sex Party
Dan Avidan – lead and backing vocals
Brian Wecht – keyboards, piano, synthesizer and programming

Additional personnel
 Tupper Ware Remix Party – backup band
 Lord Phobos – guitar
 Commander Meouch – bass guitar
 Doctor Sung – keytar
 Havve Hogan – drums
 Jim Arsenault – production
 Super Guitar Bros – acoustic guitar ("Rocket Man")
 Satchel – guitar ("Limelight")

Charts

References

Ninja Sex Party albums
2017 albums
Covers albums